The Cellulomonadaceae are a family of bacteria.

References

Micrococcales